Acid Mother's Temple & The Melting Paraiso U.F.O. is a cassette by Acid Mother's Temple & The Melting Paraiso U.F.O. released in 1996 by the band's own label in a limited edition of only 10 copies, which were sold at a show where band leader Kawabata Makoto played. The band name was written with an apostrophe on this cassette, but this was later changed.

The cassette features the band's first sessions, recorded at Acid Mothers Temple from 1995 to 1996.

Two of the tracks were reissued by Synesthetic Recordings in 2007 on the Triple Trip Edition bonus LP of the compilation The Early Acid Mothers Temple Recordings 1995–1997. The remaining track, "Psycho Line", was considered to be of inferior musical value and was omitted from this reissue on the request of Kawabata Makoto.

Track listing
Side A:
 "Freak Out Mu"
 "Psycho Line"

Side B:
 "Speed Guru"

Personnel
 Cotton Casino – voices, synthesizer
 Suhara Keizou – bass
 Kawabata Makoto – guitar, synthesizer, producer, engineer
 Higashi Hiroshi – guitar

Additional personnel
 Momo – bass
 Koizumi Hajime – drums, percussion, saxophone
 Mano Kazuhiko – saxophone

Acid Mothers Temple albums
1996 albums